The SAFF U-15/U-17 Women's Championship is association football tournament for women's national teams under the age of 15. The tournament is organized by South Asian Football Federation (SAFF).

Results
U15 Women's format

U17 Women's format

History
The tournament began in 2017 and is hosted every other year. For 2021, the decision was made to make the tournament a U-16 tournament versus the previous three iterations which had been U-15. However, the tournament was ultimately postponed. Later, Bangladesh was declared to be the host of the 4th edition, which is going to take place in U-15 format on late 2022.

Participating nations
Legend

 – Champions
 – Runners-up
 – Third place
 – Fourth place
GS – Group stage
q – Qualified for upcoming tournament
 — Hosts
 ×  – Did not enter
 •  – Did not qualify
 ×  – Withdrew before qualification
 — Withdrew after qualification
 — Disqualified after qualification

References

 
SAFF competitions
Youth football competitions
Under-15 association football
Recurring sporting events established in 2017
Women's association football competitions in Asia
2017 establishments in Asia